Mond Mond Mond  is a German television series.

See also
List of German television series

External links
 

German children's television series
1977 German television series debuts
1977 German television series endings
Fictional representations of Romani people
German-language television shows
ZDF original programming